Krome Studios Pty Ltd. is an Australian video game company. Its headquarters were in Brisbane and it previously had offices in Adelaide and Melbourne (Krome Studios Melbourne). Krome Studios is best known for their Ty the Tasmanian Tiger games and for their reboot of the Spyro the Dragon series.  Krome has created games for the Xbox, GameCube, Wii, Game Boy Advance, Dreamcast, PlayStation, PlayStation 2, Macintosh and PC. Krome has also developed for Xbox 360, PlayStation 3, Wii, PlayStation Portable, Windows Phone 7 and iOS.

History
The company was founded in 1999 by Robert Walsh, who is the current CEO, Steve Stamatiadis, the creative director and John Passfield, the design director who left the company in 2005.

In 2007, Krome Studios places on the Develop 100 List at #94 being the only Australian game development studio to make the list this year after releasing The Legend of Spyro: A New Beginning the year before (2006). Three years later in 2010, Krome Studios was awarded the number 52 spot. Also in this year Krome Studios entered into a technology sharing agreement with Emergent Game Technologies.

On 18 August 2010, it was reported that Krome had closed down their Adelaide studios and made significant staff cuts to their Melbourne and Brisbane offices, with as many as 100 staff let go. On 18 October 2010, it was reported that all remaining staff were let go; however, on 1 November CEO Robert Walsh responded to an email sent by IGN stating that Krome Studios had not closed down.

In July 2012, Krome Studios re-opened their website which remained dormant since their fall in 2010, announcing that Ty the Tasmanian Tiger would return. Since then Krome have developed two games based on Ty the Tasmanian Tiger for iOS and PC. They have also developed several other titles for iOS, including Play Maker and Whole Wide World (for the child learning company, Fingerprint) and Toy Soldiers: Boot Camp, on Windows Phone 7.

In March 2016, Krome Studios re-released an PC remastered port of Ty the Tasmanian Tiger on Steam Early Access for the PC only, with increased resolution textures, and new lighting, shadow and reflection effects, which left early access that December. They would go on to do the same thing with Bush Rescue and Night of the Quinkan in each following year respectively.

Games developed by Krome Studios

Windows
Mike Stewart's Pro Bodyboarding (1999)
Championship Surfer (2000) 
Barbie Beach Vacation (2001) 
Disney's Extremely Goofy Skateboarding (2001) 
Barbie: Sparkling Ice Show (2002) 
Star Wars: The Clone Wars – Republic Heroes (2009) 
Game Room (2010) 
Blade Kitten (2010) 
Kat Burglar (cancelled)
Ty the Tasmanian Tiger 4 (2015)
Ty the Tasmanian Tiger (2016)
Ty the Tasmanian Tiger 2: Bush Rescue (2017)
Ty the Tasmanian Tiger 3: Night of the Quinkan (2018)
The Bard's Tale Trilogy (2018)
Wasteland Remastered (2020)

Consoles
Championship Surfer (PlayStation, Dreamcast) (2000)
Sunny Garcia Surfing (PlayStation 2) (2001)
Ty the Tasmanian Tiger (PlayStation 2, Xbox, GameCube) (2002)
The Adventures of Jimmy Neutron Boy Genius: Jet Fusion (PlayStation 2, GameCube) (2003)
Ty the Tasmanian Tiger 2: Bush Rescue (PlayStation 2, Xbox, GameCube) (2004)
King Arthur (PlayStation 2, Xbox, GameCube) (2004)
Ty the Tasmanian Tiger 3: Night of the Quinkan (PlayStation 2, Xbox, GameCube) (2005)
The Legend of Spyro: A New Beginning (PlayStation 2, Xbox, GameCube, Game Boy Advance) (2006)
The Legend of Spyro: The Eternal Night (PlayStation 2, Wii) (2007)
Viva Piñata: Party Animals (Xbox 360) (2007)
Hellboy: The Science of Evil (PlayStation 3, Xbox 360, PlayStation Portable) (2008)
Star Wars: The Force Unleashed (PlayStation 2, Wii, PlayStation Portable) (2008)
Star Wars: The Clone Wars - Lightsaber Duels, (Wii) (2008)
Scene It? Box Office Smash (Xbox 360) (2008)
Star Wars: The Clone Wars – Republic Heroes (PlayStation 3, Xbox 360, Wii, PlayStation 2, PlayStation Portable) (2009)
Transformers: Revenge of the Fallen (PlayStation 2, Wii) (2009)
Game Room (Xbox 360) (2010)
Blade Kitten (PlayStation 3, Xbox 360) (2010)
Legend of the Guardians: The Owls of Ga'Hoole (Xbox 360, PlayStation 3, Wii) (2010)
Full House Poker (Xbox 360) (2011)
The Bard's Tale Trilogy (Xbox One) (2019)
Wasteland Remastered (Xbox One) (2020)
Ty the Tasmanian Tiger HD (Xbox One, Xbox Series X/S, Nintendo Switch, PlayStation 4) (2020)
Ty the Tasmanian Tiger 2: Bush Rescue HD (Xbox One, Xbox Series X/S, Nintendo Switch, PlayStation 4) (2021)
Star Wars: The Force Unleashed (Nintendo Switch) (2022)

Mobile and web
Game Room (Windows Phone 7) (2010)
Full House Poker (Windows Phone 7) (2011)
Toy Soldiers: Boot Camp (Windows Phone 7) (2012)
Playmaker (iOS) (2011)
Whole Wide World (iOS) (2012)
Bush Rescue HQ (Facebook) (2010)
Ty The Tasmanian Tiger: Boomerang Blast (iOS) (2012)
Fruit Ninja – Math Master (iOS/Android) (2015)
Disney Imagicademy – Frozen Early Science Cooking and Animal Care (iOS/Android) (2015) (in collaboration with Disney)
Hidden Pictures (iOS/Android) (2015)
Monster Dash (iOS/Android) (2020)

References

External links

 
Australian companies established in 1999
Video game companies of Australia
Video game companies established in 1999
Video game development companies
Indie video game developers
Companies based in Brisbane